Per Arneberg (4 January 1901 – 9 October 1981) was a Norwegian poet, prosaist and translator, born in Tønsberg.

Among his books are Dagen og natten (1939), Oslostreif (1949) and Oktobernetter (1971). He edited the poetry anthology Norsk lyrikk. Mellomkrigstiden (1966).

He was awarded the Riksmål Society Literature Prize in 1971.

References

1901 births
1981 deaths
Writers from Tønsberg
20th-century Norwegian poets
Norwegian male poets
20th-century Norwegian male writers